Cliniodes paradisalis is a moth in the family Crambidae. It was described by Heinrich Benno Möschler in 1886. It is found in Jamaica, Cuba and on the Cayman Islands.

References

Moths described in 1886
Eurrhypini